The Mount Egmont Branch was a short but steep branch railway line in Taranaki, New Zealand, built to supply rail ballast for the Taranaki and Whanganui districts from a quarry on Mount Taranaki (known as Egmont during the line's lifetime). Although officially known as a branch, the line was more akin to an industrial siding, with only ballast being carried.

Construction
A "Mount Egmont branch" line of about 9 miles (14 km) was authorised by the Railways Authorisation Act, 1904. The branch left the Marton–New Plymouth Line at Waipuku, 9 km north of Stratford.

Work started in 1906, and the first 9.6 km section was handed over to the New Zealand Railways Department by 1 April 1908. The line was extended to about 11 km from the main line by 1912–13, but an upper quarry extension to an elevation of 930m (which would have made it the highest line in New Zealand by over 100m) was not proceeded with.

As the readily available rock was worked out by 1937 and it was cheaper to supply ballast from riverbed plants, most of the branch closed in 1938 and the remainder, which had been unused for years, in 1951.

Today
Between the junction and the edge of Egmont National Park, few signs of the branch remain. Within the park, the old roadbed has been converted into a walking track maintained by the Department of Conservation. Various relics of the railway and quarrying activity are visible from the track, most notably the substantial remnants of the ballast crusher.

See also
Marton-New Plymouth Line
Ōpunake/Kapuni Branch
Stratford–Okahukura Line
Waitara Branch

References

Citations

Bibliography 

 
 
 Hermann, Bruce J; North Island Branch Lines p 47 (2007, New Zealand Railway & Locomotive Society, Wellington)

External links 

 York Road Loop Track, the walking track that uses some of the old railway line.

Railway lines in New Zealand
Rail transport in Taranaki
Railway lines opened in 1908
Railway lines closed in 1951
3 ft 6 in gauge railways in New Zealand
1908 establishments in New Zealand
Closed railway lines in New Zealand